David Massey may refer to:

 David Massey (author), British novelist
 David Massey (director), American filmmaker
 David Massey (music executive), American record executive
 David B. Massey (born 1959), American mathematician